The Brick Gothic House is a historical residence located south of Albia in rural Monroe County, Iowa, United States.  Built in 1885 it is a rare example of a Gothic Revival house located on a farm in southeast Iowa. The 2 story brick house features nine Gothic arch windows on the first floor and three on the second level. A polygonal bay is located on the south elevation. The structure follows a T-plan, with the main entrance in the leg of the "T". A single-story porch is located in an inside corner, also on the south side.  The house was listed on the National Register of Historic Places in 1994.

References

Houses completed in 1870
Gothic Revival architecture in Iowa
Houses in Monroe County, Iowa
Houses on the National Register of Historic Places in Iowa
National Register of Historic Places in Monroe County, Iowa